The following is a partial list of the "C" codes for Medical Subject Headings (MeSH), as defined by the United States National Library of Medicine (NLM).

This list continues the information at List of MeSH codes (C19). Codes following these are found at List of MeSH codes (C21). For other MeSH codes, see List of MeSH codes.

The source for this content is the set of 2006 MeSH Trees from the NLM.

– immune system diseases

– autoimmune diseases

– Addison disease

– anemia, hemolytic, autoimmune

– anti-glomerular basement membrane disease

– antiphospholipid syndrome

– arthritis, rheumatoid
  – arthritis, juvenile rheumatoid
  – Felty's syndrome
  – Sjögren syndrome
  – spondylitis, ankylosing
  – Still's disease, adult-onset

– autoimmune diseases of the nervous system
  – demyelinating autoimmune diseases, cns
  – diffuse cerebral sclerosis of schilder
  – encephalomyelitis, acute disseminated
  – leukoencephalitis, acute hemorrhagic
  – multiple sclerosis
  – multiple sclerosis, chronic progressive
  – multiple sclerosis, relapsing-remitting
  – neuromyelitis optica
  – myelitis, transverse
  – neuromyelitis optica
  – neuromyelitis optica
  – Lambert–Eaton myasthenic syndrome
  – leukoencephalitis, acute hemorrhagic
  – myasthenia gravis
  – myasthenia gravis, autoimmune, experimental
  – myasthenia gravis, neonatal
  – nervous system autoimmune disease, experimental
  – encephalomyelitis, autoimmune, experimental
  – myasthenia gravis, autoimmune, experimental
  – neuritis, autoimmune, experimental
  – polyradiculoneuropathy
  – Guillain–Barré syndrome
  – Miller Fisher syndrome
  – hereditary sensory and autonomic neuropathies
  – dysautonomia, familial
  – polyradiculoneuropathy, chronic inflammatory demyelinating
  – stiff-person syndrome
  – uveomeningoencephalitic syndrome
  – vasculitis, central nervous system
  – lupus vasculitis, central nervous system
  – temporal arteritis

– dermatitis herpetiformis

– diabetes mellitus, type 1

– familial Mediterranean fever

– glomerulonephritis, iga

– glomerulonephritis, membranous

– Goodpasture syndrome

– Graves' disease
  – Graves' ophthalmopathy

– hepatitis, autoimmune

– Lambert–Eaton myasthenic syndrome

– lupus erythematosus, systemic
  – lupus nephritis
  – lupus vasculitis, central nervous system

– ophthalmia, sympathetic

– pemphigoid, bullous

– pemphigus
  – pemphigus, benign familial

– polyendocrinopathies, autoimmune

– purpura, thrombocytopenic, idiopathic

– Reiter disease

– thyroiditis, autoimmune

– blood group incompatibility

– erythroblastosis, fetal
  – hydrops fetalis
  – kernicterus

– rh isoimmunization

– glomerulonephritis, membranoproliferative

– graft vs host disease

– hypersensitivity

– drug hypersensitivity
  – drug eruptions
  – epidermal necrolysis, toxic
  – erythema nodosum
  – serum sickness

– environmental illness
  – multiple chemical sensitivity
  – sick building syndrome

– hypersensitivity, delayed
  – dermatitis, allergic contact
  – dermatitis, photoallergic
  – dermatitis, toxicodendron

– hypersensitivity, immediate
  – anaphylaxis
  – conjunctivitis, allergic
  – dermatitis, atopic
  – food hypersensitivity
  – egg hypersensitivity
  – milk hypersensitivity
  – nut hypersensitivity
  – peanut hypersensitivity
  – wheat hypersensitivity
  – respiratory hypersensitivity
  – alveolitis, extrinsic allergic
  – bird fancier's lung
  – farmer's lung
  – aspergillosis, allergic bronchopulmonary
  – asthma
  – asthma, exercise-induced
  – status asthmaticus
  – rhinitis, allergic, perennial
  – rhinitis, allergic, seasonal
  – urticaria
  – angioneurotic edema

– immune complex diseases
  – arthus reaction
  – serum sickness
  – vasculitis, hypersensitivity
  – purpura, schoenlein-henoch
  – vasculitis, allergic cutaneous

– latex hypersensitivity

– Wissler's syndrome

– immunologic deficiency syndromes

– agammaglobulinemia

– ataxia–telangiectasia

– common variable immunodeficiency

– DiGeorge syndrome

– dysgammaglobulinemia
  – IgA deficiency
  – IgG deficiency

– hiv infections
  – acquired immunodeficiency syndrome
  – aids arteritis, central nervous system
  – aids-associated nephropathy
  – aids dementia complex
  – aids-related complex
  – aids-related opportunistic infections
  – hiv-associated lipodystrophy syndrome
  – hiv enteropathy
  – hiv seropositivity
  – hiv wasting syndrome

– deltaretrovirus infections
  – enzootic bovine leukosis
  – htlv-i infections
  – leukemia-lymphoma, t-cell, acute, htlv-i-associated
  – htlv-ii infections
  – leukemia, t-cell, htlv-ii-associated

– leukocyte-adhesion deficiency syndrome

– lymphopenia
  – t-lymphocytopenia, idiopathic cd4-positive

– phagocyte bactericidal dysfunction
  – Chédiak–Higashi syndrome
  – Aleutian mink disease
  – granulomatous disease, chronic
  – Job's syndrome

– severe combined immunodeficiency

– Wiskott–Aldrich syndrome

– immunoproliferative disorders

– hypergammaglobulinemia
  – monoclonal gammopathies, benign

– lymphoproliferative disorders
  – giant lymph node hyperplasia
  – immunoblastic lymphadenopathy
  – immunoproliferative small intestinal disease
  – infectious mononucleosis
  – leukemia, hairy cell
  – leukemia, lymphocytic
  – leukemia, myeloid
  – leukemia, nonlymphocytic, acute
  – leukemia, myelocytic, acute
  – leukemia, plasmacytic
  – lymphangiomyoma
  – lymphangioleiomyomatosis
  – lymphoma
  – Hodgkin disease
  – lymphoma, non-Hodgkin
  – lymphoma, b-cell
  – Burkitt's lymphoma
  – lymphoma, aids-related
  – lymphoma, mucosa-associated lymphoid tissue
  – lymphoma, small-cell
  – lymphoma, diffuse
  – lymphoma, large-cell, diffuse
  – lymphoma, large-cell, immunoblastic
  – lymphoma, lymphoblastic
  – lymphoma, mixed-cell, diffuse
  – lymphoma, small cleaved-cell, diffuse
  – lymphoma, mantle-cell
  – lymphoma, small lymphocytic
  – lymphoma, small noncleaved-cell
  – lymphoma, follicular
  – lymphoma, large-cell, follicular
  – lymphoma, mixed-cell, follicular
  – lymphoma, small cleaved-cell, follicular
  – lymphoma, high-grade
  – lymphoma, large-cell, immunoblastic
  – lymphoma, lymphoblastic
  – lymphoma, small noncleaved-cell
  – Burkitt's lymphoma
  – lymphoma, intermediate-grade
  – lymphoma, large-cell, diffuse
  – lymphoma, large-cell, follicular
  – lymphoma, mixed-cell, diffuse
  – lymphoma, small cleaved-cell, diffuse
  – lymphoma, mantle-cell
  – lymphoma, large-cell
  – lymphoma, large-cell, diffuse
  – lymphoma, large-cell, follicular
  – lymphoma, large-cell, immunoblastic
  – lymphoma, large-cell, ki-1
  – lymphoma, lymphoblastic
  – lymphoma, low-grade
  – lymphoma, mixed-cell, follicular
  – lymphoma, mucosa-associated lymphoid tissue
  – lymphoma, small cleaved-cell, follicular
  – lymphoma, small lymphocytic
  – lymphoma, mixed-cell
  – lymphoma, mixed-cell, diffuse
  – lymphoma, mixed-cell, follicular
  – lymphoma, small-cell
  – lymphoma, small cleaved-cell, diffuse
  – lymphoma, mantle-cell
  – lymphoma, small cleaved-cell, follicular
  – lymphoma, small lymphocytic
  – lymphoma, small noncleaved-cell
  – lymphoma, t-cell
  – lymphoma, lymphoblastic
  – lymphoma, t-cell, cutaneous
  – lymphoma, large-cell, ki-1
  – mycosis fungoides
  – Sézary syndrome
  – lymphoma, t-cell, peripheral
  – lymphoma, undifferentiated
  – lymphoma, large-cell, diffuse
  – lymphoma, small noncleaved-cell
  – Burkitt's lymphoma
  – plasmacytoma
  – multiple myeloma
  – reticuloendotheliosis
  – mast-cell sarcoma
  – Marek's disease
  – Sézary syndrome
  – tumor lysis syndrome

– paraproteinemias
  – cryoglobulinemia
  – heavy chain disease
  – immunoproliferative small intestinal disease
  – monoclonal gammopathies, benign
  – Schnitzler syndrome
  – multiple myeloma
  – POEMS syndrome
  – waldenstrom macroglobulinemia

– purpura, thrombocytopenic

– purpura, thrombocytopenic, idiopathic

The list continues at List of MeSH codes (C21).

C20